Squetah Creek is a stream in Kootenai County, Idaho, in the United States.

Squetah was the name of a Spokane Indian woman.

See also
List of rivers of Idaho

References

Rivers of Kootenai County, Idaho
Rivers of Idaho